The Karerpass (1745 m) is a high mountain pass in the province of South Tyrol in Italy. It connects Bolzano through the Eggental and the Welschnofen Valley with the Fassa Valley. Just below the pass on the Welschnofen Valley side is the Karersee lake. It is connected to the Tierser Tal by the Nigerpass.

See also
 List of highest paved roads in Europe
 List of mountain passes

Mountain passes of the Dolomites
Mountain passes of South Tyrol